Canoe Lake is a lake in the Township of The North Shore in Algoma District, Ontario, Canada, about  north of Serpent River.

There is a second Canoe Lake in Algoma District further west, Canoe Lake (Scarfe Township), on the Blind River system.

See also
List of lakes in Ontario

References

Lakes of Algoma District